Marjaana Maijala (b. 28. October Lahti, Finland) is a Finnish actress, who has appeared in several feature films and television series. She has also performed in several Finnish theatres, including The National Theatre of Finland.

Maijala's first film role was in the 1994 film Kissan kuolema. Her breakthrough role was in the television series Pieni pala jumalaa (1999). She received the Venla Award for Best Actress in television for her performance. In the early 2000s she appeared in the Klaus Härö films Elina: As If I Wasn't There (2002) and Mother of Mine (2005). Her later filmography includes the television series Kotikatu and such films as Oma maa (2018) and The Blind Man Who Did Not Want to See Titanic (2021).

Maijala graduated from the Helsinki Theatre Academy in 2000.

Selected filmography

Films

TV Series

References

External links 

 

Finnish actresses
1968 births
Living people
People from Lahti